"Dirty Old Town" is a song written by Ewan MacColl in 1949 that was made popular by The Dubliners and The Pogues.

History
The song was written about Salford, Lancashire, England, the city where MacColl was born and brought up. It was originally composed for an interlude to cover an awkward scene change in his 1949 play Landscape with Chimneys, set in a North of England industrial town, but with the growing popularity of folk music the song became a standard. The first verse refers to the gasworks croft, which was a piece of open land adjacent to the gasworks, and then speaks of the old canal, which was the Manchester, Bolton & Bury Canal. The line in the original version about smelling a spring on “the Salford wind” is sometimes sung as “the sulphured wind”. But in any case, most singers tend to drop the Salford reference altogether, in favour of calling the wind “smoky”. (This is the case in MacColl's own 1983 recording of the song.) 

The Pogues' version of the song is played during the team walk-on at Salford City FC.

Charts

The Dubliners version

Certifications

References

External links
 Discussion of lyrics at The Mudcat Cafe
 Material on Salford Gasworks at The National Archives

1949 songs
The Dubliners songs
Rod Stewart songs
The Pogues songs
Songs written by Ewan MacColl
1956 singles
1968 singles
Major Minor Records singles
The Specials songs
British songs
Salford City F.C.
Esther & Abi Ofarim songs